Luitgard Im (12 January 1930 – 21 February 1997) was a German theater and film actress. She was active in many movies and TV-production for almost 50 years.

Biography
Luitgard Im was born in Wemding, Germany.

Luitgard Im debuted on film in the German movie Alle kann ich nicht heiraten in 1952. The following years she had the lead role in many TV-movies like Die Stunde der Antigone, Phädra, and Fräulein Julie. She won particular fame as Electra and as Judith in the eponymous plays by Jean Giraudoux and as Cleopatra in George Bernard Shaw's Caesar and Cleopatra. She received considerable success in the movie  in 1969. In 1965, she received the Golden Camera award. Im had several roles in popular TV-series like Der Kommissar, Der Alte and Derrick, where she appeared in two episodes (in 1975 and 1981). Her final role was in the German TV-series Air Albatros in 1994.

Im died aged 67 in her birth town Wemding in 1997.

A book under the title Arm, aber reich... was published posthumously with experienced and told anecdotes of Luitgard Im.

Filmography

Film
1952: I Can't Marry Them All - Emmi
1955: Urlaub auf Ehrenwort - Dagmar Köhler
1966: Spätere Heirat erwünscht - Nina
1969: When Sweet Moonlight Is Sleeping in the Hills - May
1979: Weichselkirschen - Anna

Television
1954: Die Generalprobe (TV Movie) - Julie
1960: Die Stunde der Antigone (TV Movie) - Antigone
1963: Beatrice und Juan (TV Movie) - Julia
1964: Elektra (TV Movie) - Elektra
1975-1981: Derrick - Frau Dederich / Kamilla Kessler
1994: Air Albatros - (final appearance)

External links 
http://www.filmportal.de/df/1d/Credits,,,,,,,,A8594B177A88475EB9BE501F74A176B3credits,,,,,,,,,,,,,,,,,,,,,,,,,,,.html Luitgard Im on Filmportal.de 

http://www.discogs.com/artist/Luitgard+Im Luitgard Im on Discogs.com

1930 births
1997 deaths
People from Donau-Ries
German film actresses
German stage actresses
German television actresses
20th-century German actresses